Saucerottia is a genus of birds in the family Trochilidae, or hummingbirds.

Species
The species now placed in this genus were formerly placed in Amazilia. A molecular phylogenetic study published in 2014 found that the genus Amazilia was polyphyletic. In the revised classification to create monophyletic genera, these species were placed in the resurrected genus Saucerottia. The genus had been introduced in 1850 by the French naturalist Charles Lucien Bonaparte with the steely-vented hummingbird as the type species. The genus name is from the specific epithet saucerrottei for the steely-vented hummingbird. The epithet was coined in 1846 by Adolphe Delattre and Jules Bourcier to honour the French physician and ornithologist Antoine Constant Saucerotte.

The genus contains eleven species:
Azure-crowned hummingbird, Saucerottia cyanocephala
Blue-vented hummingbird, Saucerottia hoffmanni
Berylline hummingbird, Saucerottia beryllina
Blue-tailed hummingbird, Saucerottia cyanura
Snowy-bellied hummingbird, Saucerottia edward
Steely-vented hummingbird, Saucerottia saucerrottei
Indigo-capped hummingbird, Saucerottia cyanifrons
Chestnut-bellied hummingbird, Saucerottia castaneiventris
Green-bellied hummingbird, Saucerottia viridigaster
Copper-rumped hummingbird, Saucerottia tobaci
Copper-tailed hummingbird, Saucerottia cupreicauda

References

 
Bird genera
Taxa named by Charles Lucien Bonaparte